Teleiodes brevivalva is a moth of the family Gelechiidae. It is found in northern Italy and Spain.

The length of the forewings is 6-6.1 mm. Adults are identical to Teleiodes vulgella.

References

Moths described in 1992
Teleiodes
Moths of Europe